The Certej mine is an epithermal gold-silver deposit located in the Apuseni Mountains of Transylvania in western Romania. The deposit extends from surface and was previously mined as an open pit. Certej contains proven and probable reserves of approximately 2.5 million ounces of gold and 16.3 million ounces of silver.

The project is owned by Eldorado Gold, a Canadian gold and based metals producer.

The project will involve mining and processing of approximately 3 million tonnes of ore per annum over a mine life of 15 years. The mine is expected to yield approximately 140,000 oz of gold and 830,000 oz of silver per year in doré, reflecting an average total process recovery of 88% for gold and approximately 80% for silver.

The mine was the site of the 1971 Certej dam failure, which resulted in 89 deaths.

References

External links 

Gold mines in Romania
Buildings and structures in Hunedoara County